Cornelia "Conny" Kreitmeier is a German singer, music cabaret artist, entertainer, composer and lead-singer of the band "The Heimatdamisch"

References

1971 births
21st-century German women singers
German composers
Living people
Musicians from Bavaria